= Hanan Lachine =

Egyptian writer

- Born: 1971 (age 54–55)
- Title: Veterinarian, novelist, writer

Hanan Lachine is an Egyptian writer born in 1971. She has published several books as well as novels.

== Education and career ==
Hanan Lachine (Arabic: حنان لاشين) is an Egyptian writer and novelist. She earned a bachelor's degree in Veterinary medicine from the University of Alexandria, and she is a member of The Writers Union of Egypt. Many of her articles were published on the websites, “Tareek as-Salam” and “Sayd al-Fawaid” and on the network “al-Alooka” and the magazine, “Mumkin” and the electronic magazine, “Be basata.”

She wrote the story and script for the radio series “Anas Fe Belad al-Aja’ib” which was recorded on Amr and Khaled's website, starring the artists Wagdi al-Arabi and Amr al-Qadi. She has also written “Musafer Zadaho al-Quran” and “Muthakerat Sa’em” two daily series that were presented on the same website during the month of Ramadan. Her novel “al-Sirdab” that was about the Arab scientist Thabit Bin Qurra won the first position in Amr Khaled Science Fiction Novels competition in 2005.

== Works ==
=== Novels ===
- Cotton Candy (original title: Ghezl el-Banat)
- The Holy Orb (original title: al-Hala al-Muqadasa)
- Ecadolli (First volume of the Mamlakat al-Balagha series)
- Opal (Second volume of the Mamlakat al-Balagha series)
- Amanos (Third volume of the Mamlakat al-Balagha series)
- Cuicol (Fourth volume of the Mamlakat al-Balagha series)
- Socotra (Fifth volume of the Mamlakat al-Balagha series)

=== Books ===
- Be a Companion (original title: koni Sahabia)
- Laughing is Not Allowed (original title: Mamnu al-Dahek)
- Beacons of Love (original title: Manarat al-Hob)
- Train to Heaven (original title: Qitar lel Jana)

== The Kingdom of the rhetoric ==
It is a pentalogy of fictional novels in which the first, Ecadoli was published in 2017, followed by Opal (2018), Amanos (2019), Cuicol (2020), and Socotra (2021). The main characters of the pentalogy come from the family of al-Sayed Tawfeeq who is also known as Abadol. The events of the novels take place in Mamlakat al-Balagha (kingdom of the rhetoric), a kingdom in which the books are alive, they breathe, and they empathize with people. The books summon warriors of readers who believe in the values that are written in the books. The chosen readers are then showed a symbol and they are carried on the backs of falcons, which take them away from their world to the kingdom of the rhetoric. At the kingdom of the rhetoric, the warriors fight and defend the values to help the books retain their words. After the mission is completed, the reader goes back to his normal life.

The name of each novel plays an important role in the roll out of the events. Although the five novels are connected to each other, each novel takes place in a different setting and has different characters. The writer seeks to convey the same message throughout her novels, and she sheds light on the mysterious aspects of the human soul. The novels offer an exciting adventure and represent a struggle between the good and the evil.

Ecadoli: This novel was published in 2017, and the name of the novel is derived from a Nubian word that means ‘I love you.’ The novel discusses love and how it affects the human soul. It also sheds light on the Nubian civilization. The main character, Anas, meets Nubians, and the events lead him to discover 10 expressions of love that come from the Nubian prince Awawa. Those expressions were written by the prince himself, and they became a part of history. The expressions talk about love and chastity and how the lover rises with his soul to rise above sin.

Opal: This novel was published in 2018. The word Opal means a sparkling precious stone that shows the colors of the spectrum. The novel revolves around Habiba, the younger sister of Anas who goes on an adventure in the kingdom of the rhetoric. She is accompanied by a young man named Yusuf who is a great thinker and a distinguished writer. Yusuf had been teleported from his room into the kingdom of the rhetoric against his will. Yusuf meets characters from his novels at the kingdom of the rhetoric, and he helps Habiba to defend her values and ideas so that she can get back her book, Aigidor. Aigidor is a Nubian word that means help me. The events keep on rolling out and they lead the reader to a world of wonders and exciting adventures.

Amanos: Published in 2019. The title of the novel here is the name of a peak in al-Nour mountain range located in Turkey, Here, the characters are from a second generation that comes after the generation of Anas and Habiba. In this novel, a corridor opens up, connecting our world and the kingdom of the rhetoric. Out of the Corridor comes out Khaled, one of Anas’ sons. Khaled suddenly disappears, and then he appears again to show his brother the novel he chose. Khaled chose a novel called Ori, which is the Nubian word for ‘two wings.’ Khaled then begins his strange journey to save his brother who was hiding in the characters of the kingdom. The novel discusses several issues such as racism, love, betrayal, brotherhood, fight over power and the connection between the members of the same family.

Cuicul: Published in 2020. Cuicul is the name of a historical Roman archaeological city located in northeastern Algeria in the state of Setif, and it is where the novel takes place. This part talks about freedom and controlling the fate of others. In one part, the writer highlighted the importance and the beauty of the Amazigh civilization, as well as the importance of human values and family bonds. The Abadol family moves to Cuicul where they undertake a new mission and adventure in the kingdom of the rhetoric. The novel is highly educational and the events are linked to the events that took place in the first three novels.

Socotra: Published in 2021. The events of this novel take place on the Yemeni island of Socotra. The characters come from the family of Mr. Tawfiq who is also known as Mr. Abadol. This novel introduces a new rank of warriors who have a different role in the kingdom of the rhetoric, and they take the role of explorers in the real world. The journey begins when someone suddenly appears Abadol's house to take them to begin their adventure. The events of this novel are completely different from the previous novels and it reveals new secrets about the kingdom of the rhetoric.
